Sulejów may refer to the following places:
Sulejów in Łódź Voivodeship (central Poland)
Sulejów, Masovian Voivodeship (east-central Poland)
Sulejów, Świętokrzyskie Voivodeship (south-central Poland)